Vietnam participated in the 2017 Asian Indoor and Martial Arts Games in Ashgabat, Turkmenistan on 17 September – 27 September 2017.

Vietnam sent 103 athletes to compete in 13 sports.

Medalists

References 

Asian Indoor and Martial Arts Games
Asian Indoor and Martial Arts Games 2017
Vietnam
Vietnam at the Asian Indoor Games